The 2021–22 Fairfield Stags women's basketball team represented Fairfield University in the 2021–22 NCAA Division I women's basketball season. The Stags, led by fifteenth and final year head coach Joe Frager, played their home games at Webster Bank Arena in Bridgeport, Connecticut as members of the Metro Atlantic Athletic Conference. They finished the season 25–7, 19–1 in MAAC play to win MACC regular and tournament titles. They received an automatic mid to the NCAA women's basketball tournament where they lost to Texas in the first round.

Frager announced on October 19, 2021, that he will retire at the end of the season, his 15th as Fairfield head coach. He finish with a record of 265–191 in 15 seasons.

Roster

Schedule and results

|-
!colspan=9 style=| Non-conference regular season

|-
!colspan=9 style=| MAAC regular season

|-
!colspan=9 style=|MAAC Women's Tournament

|-
!colspan=9 style=|NCAA Women's Tournament

See also
 2021–22 Fairfield Stags men's basketball team

References

External links
 Official Team Website

Fairfield Stags
Fairfield Stags women's basketball seasons
Fairfield
Fairfield
Fairfield